D'Arcy-McGee is a provincial electoral district in the Montreal region of the province of Quebec, Canada, that elects members to the National Assembly of Quebec.  It consists of the cities of Côte-Saint-Luc and Hampstead and part of the Côte-des-Neiges–Notre-Dame-de-Grâce borough of the city of Montreal. It is the only provincial electoral district in Quebec with a Jewish plurality. It is considered to be one of the safest districts in Quebec for the Liberals; in the 2014 provincial election the Liberals garnered 92% of the vote, making it the most secure seat in the province.

It was created for the 1966 election from parts of the former Montréal-Outremont and Westmount–Saint-Georges electoral districts.

The boundaries of the D'Arcy-McGee electoral district on the 2011 electoral map are identical to the previous boundaries. Following the 2017 redistribution, the riding will lose its territory in Notre-Dame-de-Grâce to the riding of Notre-Dame-de-Grâce and will gain a large part of the Côte-des-Neiges neighbourhood from Mont-Royal and Outremont.

The riding was named after Thomas D'Arcy McGee, a Father of Confederation.

Members of the Legislative Assembly / National Assembly
This riding has elected the following Members of the National Assembly:

Geography

D'Arcy-McGee is located on the island of Montreal.

It consists of the municipalities of:

Côte Saint-Luc
Hampstead
Montreal (part)

Linguistic demographics
Anglophone: 42.4%
Allophone: 38.2%
Francophone: 19.3%

Election results

* Result compared to Action démocratique

|-

|-
|}

|-
 
|Socialist Democracy
|Abraham Weizfeld
|align="right"|135
|align="right"|0.42
|align="right"|–
|-
 
|Natural law
|Ena Kahn 
|align="right"|77
|align="right"|0.24
|align="right"|-0.24
|-
|}

|-

|New Democrat
|Heather Yampolsky
|align="right"|937
|align="right"|3.76
|align="right"|–
|-

|Christian Socialist
|Jocelyn Rivest 
|align="right"|67
|align="right"|0.27
|align="right"|–
|-
|}

|}

|-
|}

|-

|-

|Democratic Alliance
|Elie Chalouh
|align="right"|950	
|align="right"|3.04
|align="right"|–
|-

|Independent
|Max Wollach
|align="right"|417
|align="right"|1.33
|align="right"|–
|-

|-
|}

|-

|-

|-

|-
|}

|-

|-

|}

References

External links
Information
 Elections Quebec

Election results
 Election results (National Assembly)
 Election results (QuébecPolitique)

Maps
 2011 map (PDF)
 2001 map (Flash)
2001–2011 changes (Flash)
1992–2001 changes (Flash)
 Electoral map of Montréal region
 Quebec electoral map, 2011

Côte Saint-Luc
Provincial electoral districts of Montreal
Darcy-McGee
21st-century Canadian politicians
Hampstead, Quebec
Côte-des-Neiges–Notre-Dame-de-Grâce